Joint Intelligence Organisation may refer to:
 Joint Intelligence Organisation (Australia)
 Joint Intelligence Organisation (United Kingdom)